Raymond "Ray" Lynch (born July 3, 1943) is an American guitarist, lutenist, keyboardist, and composer. He began his musical career in 1967 by performing in The Renaissance Quartet in New York City before leaving in 1974 and giving up his musical career. During his hiatus, Lynch studied with his spiritual teacher, Adi Da, who would ultimately encourage him to return to music.  Lynch released five albums during the 1980s and 1990s, including The Sky of Mind, Deep Breakfast, No Blue Thing, and Nothing Above My Shoulders but the Evening. Initially producing his music independently, Lynch eventually worked with Music West. After Lynch sued and left the company, Lynch joined Windham Hill in 1992 before retiring in 2000. Lynch has won three Billboard awards.

Early life
Lynch was born on July 3, 1943 in Salt Lake City, Utah. As the second of four children, Lynch was raised in West Texas. Lynch's father was a lawyer; Lynch's mother was a noted watercolorist and an amateur pianist who influenced him to create music as a child. Other early influences included hymns and soundtracks. Lynch began studying the piano at the age of six. At age twelve, he was inspired by Andrés Segovia's classical recordings and decided to pursue a career in music. After attending High School in both St. Stephen's Episcopal School and Austin High School, Lynch went to the Austin campus of the University of Texas. After studying there for a year, he moved to Barcelona with his then wife Ginny and his child. Over there, he was apprenticed to Eduardo Sainz de la Maza, a classical guitar teacher. Three years later Lynch returned to the university to study composition with various instruments including guitar, lute, and vihuela. While Lynch went on to become a musician, his siblings ended up becoming lawyers.

Life and career
In 1967, while still in college, Lynch was invited to New York City to join The Renaissance Quartet, performing the lute alongside Robert White (tenor), Barbara Mueser (viol), and Morris Newman (recorder), replacing Joseph Iadone. Lynch also performed with other groups, such as "Festival Winds", as well as collaborative and solo performances. Lynch also taught the guitar, lute, and vihuela in the Mexican city of Taxco in the late 1960s. During his career, Lynch purchased a 125-acre farm in Maine. By 1974, Lynch experienced a "spiritual crisis" that led to his decision to move from Maine to California and give up his musical career. Although he became a carpenter and a purchasing agent in California, Lynch also continued to practice his compositional skills. In an interview with The Arizona Republic, Lynch said that his return to music was prompted by a suggestion from his spiritual teacher, Adi Da, in California.

To prepare for his return to music, Lynch bought an ARP Odyssey with "borrowed money" in 1980; the synthesizer helped him create music in the developing electronic genre. Two years later, Lynch released his first album, Truth Is the Only Profound, which recites the teachings of Adi Da "set to the background of devotional music and songs". Lynch later followed up with an instrumental album, The Sky of Mind. When Lynch released his third album, Deep Breakfast, in 1984 independently, he sold over 72,000 albums out of his small apartment. Lynch was featured on Musical Starstreams on June 1985. Immediately after joining Music West in Winter 1985, he released Deep Breakfast to a wider audience. The album was eventually certified Platinum by the RIAA. In 1989, No Blue Thing became Lynch's first album to hit #1 on Billboard's "Top New Age Albums" chart.  No Blue Thing was also his only album to appear on Billboard's "Top 200 Albums", peaking at #197. It won Billboard's "Top New Age Album" in 1990, and Lynch also won Billboard's "Top New Age Artist" in both 1989 and 1990.

During his time with Music West, Lynch was featured on Good Morning America as well as the Spanish La 1 program "Música N.A.". In 1991, Lynch sued Music West for allegedly not paying him for his work. He left Music West, taking the rights to his music with him, and signed up with Windham Hill Records. Under the new label, Lynch's albums The Sky of Mind and No Blue Thing (but not Deep Breakfast) were re-released on September 1992 with new album covers.

Under the new record company, Lynch followed up with his final album, the classical Nothing Above My Shoulders but the Evening, in 1993. The album featured members of the San Francisco Symphony. Like the preceding album, it hit #1 on the "Top New Age Albums" chart. In 1998, Lynch released his first and only compilation album, Ray Lynch: Best Of, Volume One, which included two original tracks and a remix of "Celestial Soda Pop".   Lynch left Windham Hill in 2000 and re-released his own catalog of music under his own record company.

On September 2015, Lynch's house was destroyed by the Valley Fire, along with his studio, awards, and the master tapes of his music. As a result, his friend Grant Valdes Huling set up a GoFundMe page, which ultimately raised over $20,000.

Influences 
Throughout his career, Lynch did not want his music to be classified as "New Age". In an interview with CD Review on August 1989, Lynch and said he didn't really mind being labeled as a "new age" artist, but says that he doesn't like "being grouped with music that I felt is, in general, pretty mediocre and boring". Lynch also said that "'classical' would be the best category for me."

Lynch had been both a student and follower of Adi Da since 1974. In regards to the spiritual nature of his music, Lynch believed that it "has to be judged subjectively by the listener, not the composer." Lynch named several of his songs and albums after the themes found in Da's novel, The Mummery Book. However, in a 1989 Arizona Republic interview, Lynch clarified that he wasn't trying to promote Da's work through his music.  After the death of Adi Da, Lynch performed various songs for Da's tribute album, "May You Ever Dwell In Our Heart", in 2009.

Discography

See also 
List of ambient music artists

Notes

References

External links
 

New-age musicians
American classical musicians
Ambient musicians
Moody College of Communication alumni
Living people
Musicians from Salt Lake City
Musicians from San Rafael, California
Windham Hill Records artists
1943 births
Classical musicians from Texas
Classical musicians from California